Writing in Asia Series was a series of books of Asian writing published by Heinemann from 1966 to 1996. Initiated and mainly edited by Leon Comber, the series brought attention to various Asian Anglophone writers, like Shirley Geok-lin Lim, Western writers based in Asia like Austin Coates and W. Somerset Maugham and modern and classic stories and novels in English translation from the Malay, Indonesian, Thai and more. The series is also credited with contributing prominently to creative writing and the creation of a shared regional identity amongst English-language writers of Southeast Asia. After publishing more than 110 titles, the series folded after Heinemann Asia was taken over by a parent group of publishers and Comber left.

History
Inspired by the successful and pioneering African Writers Series, Leon Comber, the then Southeast Asian Representative of Heinemann Educational Books Ltd., founded the series as its general editor in 1966 in Singapore. Comber thought a similar series focussing initially on Southeast Asia was worth pursuing to "give a tremendous boost to creative writing in English...which was still regarded then as something of a cultural desert". He also wanted to publish the "tremendous body of local writers writing in their local languages" across the entire Asia in English translation "to make it available to a wider reading public" as he felt that existent publishers only focussed on their individual countries.

Buoyed by the profits made from textbook publishing, the series first published Modern Malaysian Chinese Stories in 1967. The anthology, whose stories were edited and mainly translated into English by Ly Singko with a foreword by Han Suyin, sold moderately, but Ly was to be detained without trial shortly after by the Singapore authorities under the Internal Security Act for supposed "Chinese chauvinism".

The series met with commercial success a decade later when two reprinted Austin Coates books in the series, Myself a Mandarin (1977, c.1968) and City of Broken Promises (1977, c.1960), became bestsellers. The former was also serialised by the BBC, broadcast on Radio Hong Kong and had its film rights sold, while the latter was adapted into a play at the 1978 Hong Kong Festival of Arts. Other commercially successful titles were Tan Kok Seng's autobiography Son of Singapore (1972), which sold over 25,000 copies, and Catherine Lim's short-story collection Little Ironies: Stories of Singapore (1978), which sold 8,000 copies. By 1988, about 15 titles in the series were used as supplementary textbooks in Singapore schools, guaranteeing sales in the thousands.

Significantly, as part of the series, Australian Harry Aveling translated Pramoedya Ananta Toer's novel The Fugitive (Perburuan) (1975, c.1950) and Iwan Simatupang's novel The Pilgrim (Ziarah) (1969) from the Indonesian to English. The Pilgrim is considered the first modern Indonesian novel and won the first ASEAN Literary Award for the novel in 1977. The series also met with critical acclaim when Shirley Geok-lin Lim's debut collection Crossing The Peninsula & Other Stories (1980) won the Commonwealth Poetry Prize, a first both for an Asian and for a woman. The series also published the debut titles of pioneering Singapore poets like Edwin Thumboo and Lee Tzu Pheng.

In 1982, however, Charles Cher, the then General Manager of Heinemann Educational Books, confirmed that the series had stopped publishing poetry because of poor sales. In 1985, after publishing more than 70 titles, Comber left the series after Heinemann Asia was taken over by a parent group of publishers. In retrospect, Comber notes that in business terms, Heinemann made "very little" from the series, though it neither lost much, with textbook publishing sales subsidising the series. The series continued until around 1996, resuming publishing poetry and diversifying its focus beyond literary fiction to ghost stories.

Some Writing in Asia series titles have since been republished by other companies, like Lloyd Fernando's novel Scorpion Orchid (1976) by Epigram Books in 2014.

List of authors and books in the Writing in Asia Series

See also
 African Writers Series
 List of Malaysian writers
 List of Indonesian-language poets

References

Series of books
Heinemann (publisher) books